José Luis Castro Aguirre (24 June 1943 – 20 January 2011) was a Mexican ichthyologist. He was a founding member of the Mexican Ichthyological Society and a member of the National System of Investigators who produced around 150 publications, focusing chiefly on the taxonomy, ecology, and biogeography of the fishes of Mexico. His 1978 book Catálogo sistemático de los peces marinos que penetran en aguas continentales de México, con aspectos zoogeográficos y ecológicos ("Systematic catalog of marine fish entering inland waters of Mexico, with zoogeographical and ecological aspects") was the first catalog of estuarine fishes of Mexico. Born in Mexico City, he attended the National School of Biological Sciences at the National Polytechnic Institute (ENCB-IPN) earning a master's degree in 1974 and a PhD in 1986. He worked at the National Fisheries Institute and the Food and Agriculture Organization in the 1960s, and later was professor and researcher at the ENCB-IPN, Universidad Autónoma Metropolitana (UAM; 1979–1987), the Interdisciplinary Center of Marine Science (CICIMAR; 1976–1979, 1994–2011) and Northeast Center of Biological Research (CIBNOR; 1987–1994). He described around a dozen fish species, including several species of shark. A book of research papers in his honor was produced in 2012, and he was posthumously commemorated in the names of the fish species Hypoplectrus castroaguirrei (a hamlet)  and  Eugerres castroaguirrei (a mojarra).

References

1943 births
2011 deaths
20th-century Mexican zoologists
Ichthyologists
Scientists from Mexico City
Instituto Politécnico Nacional alumni
Academic staff of the Instituto Politécnico Nacional